Jeff Gove (born May 28, 1971) is an American professional golfer who has played on the PGA Tour and the Web.com Tour.

Gove was born in Seattle, Washington. He played college golf at Pepperdine University. He turned professional in 1994.

Gove was a member of PGA Tour in 2000, 2002, 2006–08, 2010, and 2013 and the Web.com Tour in 1995–99, 2001, 2003–05, 2009, 2010–12, and 2014. He has won three times on the Web.com Tour and his best finishes on the PGA Tour were T-6 at the 2006 Booz Allen Classic and the 2007 John Deere Classic.

In 2007, Gove earned the final spot in the FedEx Cup playoffs by finishing 144th in the points standings.

In 2009, Gove finished 17th on the Nationwide Tour money list to earn his 2010 PGA Tour card.

Professional wins (7)

Nationwide Tour wins (3)

*Note: The 2005 Oregon Classic was shortened to 54 holes due to rain.

Nationwide Tour playoff record (1–2)

Other wins (4)
1995 Washington Open
2012 Washington Open
2015 TaylorMade Pebble Beach Invitational
2022 Oregon Open

Results in major championships

CUT = missed the halfway cut
Note: Gove only played in the U.S. Open.

See also
1999 Nike Tour graduates
2001 Buy.com Tour graduates
2005 Nationwide Tour graduates
2009 Nationwide Tour graduates
2012 PGA Tour Qualifying School graduates

References

External links

American male golfers
Pepperdine Waves men's golfers
PGA Tour golfers
Korn Ferry Tour graduates
Golfers from California
Golfers from Seattle
People from San Marcos, California
1971 births
Living people